The 30th Primetime Emmy Awards were held on September 17, 1978. The ceremony was broadcast on CBS, from the Pasadena Civic Auditorium, Pasadena, California.

The top shows of the night were All in the Family, which won its then record fourth Emmy for Outstanding Comedy Series, and The Rockford Files. CBS continued its streak of dominance by winning its eighth straight Emmy for Outstanding Comedy Series, this record still stands. Actor Will Geer received three posthumous acting nominations for three different performances, but lost in each category.

For the first time in Emmy history, two shows won six major awards, All in the Family became the first show to win six major awards twice, and the miniseries Holocaust tied the record for most wins by a miniseries set the previous year by Roots.

This ceremony was interrupted for thirty minutes by a nationally televised address by then-President Jimmy Carter, joined by then-Israeli prime minister Menachem Begin and then-Egyptian president Anwar Sadat in which President Carter announced the signing of the Camp David Accords.

Rita Moreno's win made her the third person to become an EGOT.

Winners and nominees

Programs

Acting

Lead performances

Supporting performances

Single performances

Directing

Writing

Most major nominations
By network 
 NBC – 61
 ABC – 59
 CBS – 53
 PBS – 13

 By program
 Holocaust (NBC) – 11
 All in the Family (CBS) – 9
 M*A*S*H (CBS) – 7
 Family (ABC) / King (NBC) – 6

Most major awards
By network 
 CBS – 14
 NBC – 11
 ABC – 7
 PBS – 2

 By program
 All in the Family (CBS) / Holocaust (NBC) – 6
 Lou Grant (CBS) – 3

Notes

References

External links
 Emmys.com list of 1978 Nominees & Winners
 

030
1978 television awards
1978 in California
September 1978 events in the United States